David Anthony Cusani (born 16 July 1959) is a former English rugby union player. Cusani played for the Orrell club as a lock and won one international cap for the England national rugby union team, against Ireland in February 1987.

References

Living people
1959 births
English rugby union players
England international rugby union players
Rugby union players from Wigan
Orrell R.U.F.C. players
Rugby union locks
Lancashire County RFU players